Helcogramma is a genus in the triplefin family Tripterygiidae. The blennies in the genus Helcogramma are found throughout the Indo-Pacific and in the South Atlantic Ocean off the islands of St Helena and Ascension.

Characteristics
The fishes in the genus Helcogramma are characterised by the possession of a continuous lateral line which bends down towards the operculum, this lateral line comprises 7–39 tubular pored scales. There are three spines in the first dorsal fin and the anal fin has one spine, the pelvic fin has a single spine and two rays. The head is scaleless and normally the bases of the dorsal and anal fins have a scaleless strip. There are five bones in the joint between the caudal fin and the vertebrae, the hypurals.

Species
There are currently 41 recognized species in this genus:
 Helcogramma albimacula J. T. Williams & Howe, 2003 (Whitespot triplefin)
 Helcogramma alkamr Holleman, 2007
 Helcogramma aquila J. T. Williams & C. J. McCormick, 1990 (Darktail triplefin)
 Helcogramma ascensionis Lubbock, 1980 (Ascension triplefin) 
 Helcogramma atauroensis Fricke & Erdmann, 2017
 Helcogramma billi P. E. Hadley, 1986
 Helcogramma capidata Rosenblatt, 1960 (Hooded triplefin)
 Helcogramma cerasina J. T. Williams & Howe, 2003 
 Helcogramma chica Rosenblatt, 1960 (Little hooded triplefin) 
 Helcogramma decurrens McCulloch & Waite, 1918 (Black-throated triplefin)
 Helcogramma desa J. T. Williams & Howe, 2003 (Neglected triplefin)
 Helcogramma ellioti (Herre, 1944)
 Helcogramma ememes Holleman, 2007
 Helcogramma fuscipectoris (Fowler, 1946) (Fourspot triplefin) 
 Helcogramma fuscopinna Holleman, 1982 (Blackfin triplefin) 
 Helcogramma gymnauchen (M. C. W. Weber, 1909) (Red-finned triplefin)
 Helcogramma hudsoni (D. S. Jordan & Seale, 1906) (Hudson's triplefin) 
 Helcogramma inclinata (Fowler, 1946) (Triangle triplefin)
 Helcogramma ishigakiensis Aoyagi, 1954 
 Helcogramma kranos R. Fricke, 1997 (Helmet triplefin)
 Helcogramma lacuna J. T. Williams & Howe, 2003
 Helcogramma larvata R. Fricke & J. E. Randall, 1992
 Helcogramma maldivensis R. Fricke & J. E. Randall, 1992
 Helcogramma microstigma Holleman, 2006
 Helcogramma nesion J. T. Williams & Howe, 2003
 Helcogramma nigra J. T. Williams & Howe, 2003 (Rotuma triplefin)
 Helcogramma novaecaledoniae R. Fricke, 1994 (New Caledonian triplefin)
 Helcogramma obtusirostris (Klunzinger, 1871) (Hotlips triplefin) 
 Helcogramma randalli J. T. Williams & Howe, 2003 (Randall's triplefin) 
 Helcogramma rharhabe Holleman, 2007
 Helcogramma rhinoceros P. E. Hadley, 1986 (Rhinocerus triplefin) 
 Helcogramma rosea Holleman, 2006 (Rosy triplefin) 
 Helcogramma serendip Holleman, 2007
 Helcogramma shinglensis Lal Mohan, 1971
 Helcogramma solorensis R. Fricke, 1997 (Solor triplefin) 
 Helcogramma springeri P. E. Hadley, 1986 (Springer's triplefin) 
 Helcogramma steinitzi E. Clark, 1980 (Red triplefin) 
 Helcogramma striata P. E. Hadley, 1986 (Tropical striped triplefin) 
 Helcogramma trigloides (Bleeker, 1858) (Scarf triplefin) 
 Helcogramma vulcana J. E. Randall & E. Clark, 1993 (Volcano triplefin) 
 Helcogramma williamsi M. C. Chiang & I. S. Chen, 2012

References

 
Tripterygiidae
Taxa named by Allan Riverstone McCulloch
Taxa named by Edgar Ravenswood Waite